Achyra nigrirenalis is a moth in the family Crambidae. It was described by George Hampson in 1913. It is found in Australia, where it has been recorded from Western Australia, the Northern Territory, Queensland and South Australia.

The forewings have a light and dark brown pattern. The hindwings are uniform pale brown.

References

Moths described in 1913
Moths of Australia
Pyraustinae
Taxa named by George Hampson